The World Association of Belarusians "Baćkaŭščyna" (lit. "Fatherland") (Belarusian: Згуртаваньне Беларусаў Сьвету "Бацькаўшчына") is an international organisation uniting people of Belarusian descent globally. Currently 135 organisations of the Belarusian diaspora from 28 countries are members of Baćkaŭščyna.

The organization was founded in 1990 and promotes Belarusian culture at home and abroad by publishing numerous books and organizing conferences, including World Congresses of Belarusians, which take place every five years.

The current President of Baćkaŭščyna is Alena Makoŭskaja. The Head of Council is Nina Šydłoŭskaja.

On 24 September 2021, the Supreme Court of Belarus liquidated the World Association of Belarusians. Its office in Minsk was previously searched and sealed.

Literature

References

External links
Official website

Organizations based in Belarus
Organizations established in 1990
1990 establishments in Belarus
Belarusian diaspora
Diaspora organizations